The 10.5 cm hrubý kanón vz. 35 (Heavy Gun model 35) was a Czech field gun used in the Second World War. Those weapons captured after the German occupation of Czechoslovakia in March 1939 were taken into Wehrmacht service as the 10.5 cm K 35(t). Former Yugoslav guns were designated as the 10.5 cm Kanone 339(j). It was used by a variety of German units during World War II, especially on coastal defense duties. 36 were in service with the Slovak Army.

Design & History
It was designed solely for motor traction. It fired  HE, canister and semi-armor-piercing shells.

Notes

Bibliography 
 Engelmann, Joachim and Scheibert, Horst. Deutsche Artillerie 1934-1945: Eine Dokumentation in Text, Skizzen und Bildern: Ausrüstung, Gliederung, Ausbildung, Führung, Einsatz. Limburg/Lahn, Germany: C. A. Starke, 1974
 Gander, Terry and Chamberlain, Peter. Weapons of the Third Reich: An Encyclopedic Survey of All Small Arms, Artillery and Special Weapons of the German Land Forces 1939-1945. New York: Doubleday, 1979 
 Kliment, Charles K. and Nakládal, Bretislav. Germany's First Ally: Armed Forces of the Slovak State 1939-1945. Atglen, PA: Schiffer, 1997 

World War II artillery of Germany
World War II field artillery
Artillery of Czechoslovakia
105 mm artillery
Military equipment introduced in the 1930s